Abe Lemons Arena is a multi-purpose arena on the campus of Oklahoma City University in Uptown Oklahoma City.

It is the home arena of the OCU Stars athletic teams, and in 2007 was to be home to the Oklahoma City Cavalry of the Continental Basketball Association. The arena seats 3,500 and was named for legendary basketball coach Abe Lemons, who won 599 games in 35 years as a head coach from 1955–90.

External links 
Arena information

Sports venues in Oklahoma City
Oklahoma City Stars men's basketball
Basketball venues in Oklahoma
College basketball venues in the United States
College volleyball venues in the United States
College wrestling venues in the United States
2000 establishments in Oklahoma
Sports venues completed in 2000